Weblio is a free integrated bilingual dictionary website and online encyclopedia for Japanese-speaking sites operated by the , formerly known as the . Weblio can perform a bulk search on a variety of dictionaries, encyclopedias and glossaries, and return results. The dictionary facility includes Kenkyūsha's New Japanese-English Dictionary and 70 other Japanese–English and English–Japanese dictionaries with 4,160,000 English words and 4,730,000 Japanese words. As of January 20, 2016, a total of 665 dictionaries, encyclopedias and glossary sites can be searched in full.

History
Beta testing began on December 12, 2005, and the site began to formally provide services searching 11 different dictionaries and encyclopedias on January 25, the following year.

References

External links

2006 establishments in Japan
Internet properties established in 2006
Internet technology companies of Japan